Pushcart Press is a publishing house established in 1972 by Bill Henderson (a one-time associate editor at Doubleday) and is perhaps most famous for its Pushcart Prize and for the anthology of prize winners it publishes annually. The press has been honored by Publishers Weekly as one of the USA's "most influential publishers" with the 1979 Carey Thomas Prize for publisher of the year. It has also won the 2005 Lifetime Achievement Award from the National Book Critics Circle and the 2006 Poets & Writers/Barnes & Noble Writers for Writers Prize.

Books

 Garden State (1992) by Rick Moody

References
 Pushcart Rolls Into 25th Year, Christina Davis, Poets & Writers Magazine, Vol. 29, Issue 1, January/February 2001
 Henderson manuscripts, Lilly Library Manuscript Collections, Indiana University

External links
 
 Entry at the New York Center for Independent Publishing (formerly Small Press Center)

Publishing companies established in 1972
Book publishing companies based in New York (state)
1972 establishments in New York (state)